Nicola Balistari (died 1479) was a Roman Catholic prelate who served as Bishop of Strongoli (1470–1479).

Biography
On 11 Mar 1470, Nicola Balistari was appointed during the papacy of Pope Paul II as Bishop of Strongoli.
He served as Bishop of Strongoli until his death in 1479.

References

External links and additional sources
 (for Chronology of Bishops) 
 (for Chronology of Bishops) 

15th-century Italian Roman Catholic bishops
Bishops appointed by Pope Paul II
1479 deaths